The 2004 Women's World Open Squash Championship is the women's edition of the 2004 World Open, which serves as the individual world championship for squash players. The event took place in Kuala Lumpur in Malaysia from 7 to 11 December 2004. Vanessa Atkinson won her first World Open trophy, beating Natalie Grinham in the final.

Seeds

Draw and results

See also
World Open
2004 Men's World Open Squash Championship

References

External links
World Open 2004 Squashtalk website

World Squash Championships
W
2004 in Malaysian women's sport
2000s in Kuala Lumpur
Sport in Kuala Lumpur
Squash tournaments in Malaysia
2004 in women's squash
International sports competitions hosted by Malaysia